Jérémy Manzorro (born 11 November 1991) is a French professional footballer of Spanish origin who plays as a midfielder for Polish club Sandecja Nowy Sącz.

Career
Born in Villeurbanne, Manzorro started his senior career at Stade de Reims. He made his first-team debut on 13 May 2011, coming on as a second-half substitute in a 1–1 away draw against Clermont Foot in the Ligue 2. In 2012, Manzorro joined Bourg-Péronnas in the Championnat National.

In July 2013, after a successful trial, Manzorro signed for Bulgarian side Chernomorets Burgas. In the 2013–14 season, he earned 30 appearances in the Bulgarian A group, scoring three goals. Manzorro's contract was terminated at the end of the season after Chernomorets finished in 11th place and relegated to B group.

On 9 June 2014, Manzorro signed for Slavia Sofia as a free agent. His first goal for Slavia came on 3 December when he scored in a 2–2 home draw against Cherno More Varna in the Bulgarian Cup. On 13 December, he scored his first hat-trick in Bulgaria, scoring all three of his team's goals in a 3–1 home league win over Levski Sofia.

On 13 January 2019, Manzorro signed for Irtysh Pavlodar.

On 12 February 2020, Manzorro signed for Shakhter Karagandy, before signing for FC Tobol on 4 August 2020.

On 16 February 2022, Astana announced the signing of Manzorro. In January 2023, the contract was terminated by mutual agreement.

On 14 March 2023, Manzorro joined Polish I liga side Sandecja Nowy Sącz until the end of the season, with an option to extend his deal for another year.

Career statistics

Club

Honours

Club
Sūduva
 A Lyga: 2017

Tobol
 Kazakhstan Premier League: 2021

References

External links
 

1991 births
Living people
People from Villeurbanne
Sportspeople from Lyon Metropolis
Footballers from Auvergne-Rhône-Alpes
French footballers
Association football midfielders
Stade de Reims players
Football Bourg-en-Bresse Péronnas 01 players
PFC Chernomorets Burgas players
PFC Slavia Sofia players
Anorthosis Famagusta F.C. players
FC Irtysh Pavlodar players
FC Shakhter Karagandy players
FC Tobol players
FC Astana players
Sandecja Nowy Sącz players
Ligue 2 players
Championnat National players
First Professional Football League (Bulgaria) players
Cypriot First Division players
Persian Gulf Pro League players
Kazakhstan Premier League players

French expatriate footballers
French expatriate sportspeople in Bulgaria
Expatriate footballers in Bulgaria
French expatriate sportspeople in Iran
Expatriate footballers in Iran
French expatriate sportspeople in Cyprus
Expatriate footballers in Cyprus
French expatriate sportspeople in Kazakhstan
Expatriate footballers in Kazakhstan
French expatriate sportspeople in Poland
Expatriate footballers in Poland